The Prisoner of Dahomey (German: Der Gefangene von Dahomey) is a 1918 German silent drama film directed by Hubert Moest and starring Fritz Delius and Paul Hartmann.

Cast
 Fritz Delius
 Paul Hartmann
 Friedrich Kühne
 Ursula Stein

References

Bibliography
 Fuhrmann, Wolfgang. Imperial Projections: Screening the German Colonies. Berghahn Books, 2015.

External links

1918 films
Films of the German Empire
German silent feature films
Films directed by Hubert Moest
German black-and-white films
1918 drama films
German drama films
Silent drama films
1910s German films
1910s German-language films